Seppo Tapio Lahtela (born 16 June 1947) is a Finnish farmer and politician. He was born in Vehkalahti and was a Member of the Parliament of Finland, representing the Centre Party from 1999 to 2006 and the National Coalition Party from 2006 to 2007.

References

1947 births
Living people
People from Hamina
Centre Party (Finland) politicians
National Coalition Party politicians
Members of the Parliament of Finland (1999–2003)
Members of the Parliament of Finland (2003–07)